Chkalovskaya is a station on the Frunzensko-Primorskaya Line of the Saint Petersburg Metro. The station was designed by Alexander Konstantinov, Alexander Bystrov and Andrey Larionov. It opened on September 15, 1997, as a Pravoberezhnaya Line station, but it was transferred to Frunzensko-Primorskaya Line on March 7, 2009. The station was named after Valery Chkalov, a famous Russian aviator. A sculpture of him, which was created by V. Sveshnikov, was erected by the station's entrance. The station's decoration features an aviation theme. The floor design invokes airport landing strips, while the lights look like components of the ANT-6 aircraft. The escalator lamps were designed to resemble propellers.

Transport 
Buses: 1, 14, 25, 185, 191.

In popular culture 
 In 2006 the station has served as a scene for a movie «Piter FM» (dir. Oksana Bychkova). Main characters set up an appointment at the monument of Valery Chkalov.

External links
https://web.archive.org/web/20070430125703/http://metro-spb.nwd.ru/Stations/5/l5_ck.htm

Saint Petersburg Metro stations
Railway stations in Russia opened in 1997
Railway stations located underground in Russia